Yuelu Mountain is located on the west bank of the Xiang River, one tributary of Wu River in Changsha, Hunan.

Introduction of Yuelu Mountain
There are more than 900 species of plants in Yuelu Mountain, and there are many ancient and famous trees, such as Podocarpus chinensis in the Jin Dynasty, ginkgo in the Tang Dynasty, camphor in the Song and Yuan Dynasties, and maple chestnut in the Ming and Qing Dynasties. Yuelu Mountain is also an area where Confucianism, Buddhism and Taoism intersect each other (三角合流).

Scenic Spots on Yuelu Mountain
Yuelu Mountain is noted for its many scenic spots, including Qingfeng Gorge, Aiwan Pavilion, Lushan Temple, Yunlu Palace, the White Crane Spring, the Flying Stone and Yuelu Academy.

Qingfeng Gorge lies in the low area between Yuelu Academy and Lushan Temple. It holds Aiwan Pavilion, one of four famous pavilions in  ancient China, the Sheli Tower, and the tombs of Huang Xing (Huang Hsing) and Cai E (Tsai E).
Autumn-Admiring Pavilion or Aiwan Pavilion and was built in A.D.1792. Its original name is Red Leaf Pavilion, later changed based on a poem by Du Mu. Mao Zedong once played and studied here and the remaining tablet was written by Mao Zedong in the 1950s. Aiwan Pavilion is supported by four red poles. There is a tablet with the poem, "Qinyuanchun, Changsha" written by Mao Zedong.
Lushan Temple is located on the side of the mountain. It was built in A.D.268 and later destroyed and rebuilt several times. It was last rebuilt in the 1980s.
Yunlu Palace is a Taoist place. The history of Taoist activities in Mount Yuelu is quite long.  Yunlu Palace was built in A.D.1478, and Mount Yuelu has been an active center since then.
The Flying Clock and Flying Stone are also famous attractions in Mount Yuelu. The Flying Clock hangs in a ginkgo tree near Yunlu Palace. Flying Stone lies under the Flying Clock.　
The King Yu Tablet:  On the Tablet there was carved an article with 77 Chinese characters, now difficult to distinguish. Under the Tablet is Yuji Brook. Yu was an ancient hero who conquered floods.
The Yuelu Academy (simplified Chinese:岳麓书院，pinyin: yuè lù shū yuàn) is one of the four famous academies in ancient China. It is located at the foot of Yuelu Mountain. As one of the oldest academy in the world, the ancient and traditional academies have been fully preserved. Yuelu Academy is also the largest and best-preserved academy complex in China.

Transportation 
Take metro Line 2 or Line 4 and get off at Yingwanzhen Station, and then walk west for about 5 minutes.

Take a taxi. Please take me to Mount Yuelu(simplified Chinese:请带我去岳麓山。pinyin:qǐng dài wǒ qù yuè lù shān)

References

Bibliography
 

Yuelu District
Geography of Changsha
Mountains of Hunan
Yuelu
Tourist attractions in Hunan